Sympistis rosea is a species of moth in the family Noctuidae (the owlet moths).

The MONA or Hodges number for Sympistis rosea is 10114.

References

Further reading

 
 
 

rosea
Articles created by Qbugbot
Moths described in 1903